Smuggler's Gold may refer to:

 Smuggler's Gold (film), 1951 American adventure film directed by William Berke
 Smuggler's Gold, the fourth book in the Merovingen Nights series by C. J. Cherryh